Christmas In America is the twenty-second studio album and a holiday album by Kenny Rogers.

Track listing

Personnel 
 Kenny Rogers – lead vocals 
 Matt Rollings – pianos 
 Mike Lawler – synthesizers 
 Larry Byrom – acoustic guitar 
 Mark Casstevens – acoustic guitar
 Steve Gibson – electric guitars
 Michael Rhodes – bass 
 Paul Leim – drums
 Farrell Morris – percussion 
 Jim Horn – saxophones, flute
 Cindy Reynolds Wyatt – harp
 Bergen White – orchestral arrangements and conductor, arrangements (7-14), backing vocals 
 Carl Gorodetzky – conductor, concertmaster 
 The Nashville String Machine – orchestra 
 Jim Ferguson – backing vocals 
 Sherilyn Huffman – backing vocals 
 Louis Nunley – backing vocals 
 Lisa Silver – backing vocals 
 Diane Vanette – backing vocals 
 Dennis Wilson – backing vocals

Production 
 Jim Ed Norman – producer 
 Eric Prestidge – producer, engineer, mixing, mastering
 Danny Kee – assistant producer 
 Daniel Johnston – assistant engineer 
 John Kunz – assistant engineer 
 Jim Valentini – assistant engineer 
 Glenn Meadows – mastering 
 Laura LiPuma – art direction 
 Beth Middleworth – design 
 Larry Dixon – album photography 
 Kelly Junkermann – photography of Kenny Rogers 

 Studios 
 Recorded at Digital Recorders and The Loft (Nashville, Tennessee).
 Mixed at The Loft
 Mastered at Masterfonics (Nashville, Tennessee).

Chart performance

References

1989 Christmas albums
Christmas albums by American artists
Kenny Rogers albums
Reprise Records albums
Albums produced by Jim Ed Norman
Country Christmas albums